This is a list of Italy international footballers who were born outside Italy.

List by country of birth

References

Lists of expatriate association football players
Association football player non-biographical articles
Lists of Italy international footballers
Italian diaspora
Change of nationality in sport